Samuel "Sam" William Frock (December 23, 1882 – November 3, 1925) was an American professional baseball player who played four Major league seasons between  and .
He was born in Baltimore, Maryland and died there at the age of 42.

External links

Baseball players from Baltimore
Boston Doves players
Pittsburgh Pirates players
Boston Rustlers players
Major League Baseball pitchers
1882 births
1925 deaths
Minor league baseball managers
Concord Marines players
Worcester Busters players
Providence Grays (minor league) players
Atlanta Crackers players
Baltimore Orioles (IL) players
Utica Utes players
Wilkes-Barre Barons (baseball) players
Binghamton Bingoes players
Nashville Vols players
Laurel Blue Hens players